Varsha Jain is a British physician known as a "space gynaecologist". She has studied at universities in the UK but with an interest in NASA. In 2021 she was a researcher at the University of Edinburgh.

Life
Jain says that she was first inspired to become a doctor after seeing the fictional Dr. Beverly Crusher in Star Trek whilst watching it with her brothers in the Birmingham area.

Her interest was inspired whilst attending the UK Space Biomedicine Conference in 2004. In 2006, she graduated from University College London with a BSc focusing on medicine is extreme environments. Five years later she was still in London completing a masters degree at King’s College London. She studied space physiology and health including as part of her thesis. In 2007 she was studying at Imperial College when she got the chance to study for seven weeks at the Johnson Space Centre. She knew that she did not want to be a normal physician and this was an opportunity to work at NASA. She worked with Exploration Medical Capability team who look at in-flight diagnosis and treatments in that time they were involved with the International Space Station.

In 2021 she was in Scotland as a researcher at the University of Edinburgh. Her research concerns "endometrial phenotype in women with Abnormal Uterine Bleeding".

Jain's interest in the health of women in space is unusual for a doctor working in academia. She has been consulted on her knowledge of how women astronauts deal with toilets, menstruation and the risk to the eggs that they carry. There are going to be more female astronauts, as NASA, in 2013, began taking equal numbers of male and female candidates. It is noted that the average age for a female astronaut's first baby is 41. Jain was asked if she would go into space and she welcomed a short trip but feared the damage done to those who were in space for some time.

References

Year of birth missing (living people)
Living people
Alumni of University College London
Alumni of King's College London
Women gynaecologists
People from Birmingham, West Midlands
21st-century British medical doctors
NASA people